Cassa di Risparmio di Pisa is a former Italian saving bank and charity organization, based in Pisa, Tuscany. The bank was spin off into a banking foundation and a Società per Azioni in 1992.

The S.p.A. was acquired by Banca Popolare di Lodi, which was completely absorbed into its subsidiary the saving bank of Lucca in 2006. While the banking foundation, Ente Cassa di Risparmio di Pisa and then Fondazione Cassa di Risparmio di Pisa (currently Fondazione Pisa), still operates as a non-profit organization. The foundation also inherited the arts collection of the former bank.

History
Cassa di Risparmio di Pisa was formed on 15 June 1834.

Casse Toscane
Due to Legge Amato, the bank was split into an ente and a società per azioni on 7 April 1992 (gazetted on 6 May). About 13.05% shares of the new company were non-voting saving shares. The ente immediately sold about 70% shares to Casse Toscane (and received 11.5% shares of Casse Toscane), a new intermediate holding company for the saving bank of Pisa, Florence, Livorno, Lucca, Pistoia–Pescia, San Miniato and Banca del Monte di Lucca. The ente only hold about 16.95% voting rights of the bank directly or about 25% combined (excluding the saving shares).

Casse del Tirreno
In 1995, CR Pisa, Livorno, Lucca and Banca Monte Lucca quit the union and formed Holding Casse del Tirreno (literally Tyrrhenian saving banks).

Banca Popolare di Lodi
In 1999, C.R. Pisa, Livorno and Lucca were acquired by Banca Popolare di Lodi (BPL) through sub-holding companies.

In 2000 C.R. Pisa had 59 branches. At that time Casse del Tirreno owned 61.69% shares of C.R. Pisa S.p.A.. Istituto di Credito delle Casse di Risparmio Italiane acted as an intermediate holding company (ICCRI, a subsidiary of Bipielle Partecipazioni, another intermediate holding company) that owned 50.01% Casse del Tirreno. However, CR Pisa SpA also owned 1.35% of Casse del Tirreno.

In 2001 Casse del Tirreno was absorbed into ICCRI – Banca Federale Europea (ex-ICCRI), which hold 61.31% shares of CR Pisa; Bipielle Partecipazioni owned an additional 12.97% shares of CR Pisa S.p.A. Pisa Foundation also became a minority shareholders of ICCRI for 7.32%, due to the transactions.

In 2002 Bipielle Retail became the new intermediate holding company for the 74.28% shares, while Pisa Foundation owned 25.63% shares of CR Pisa S.p.A., as well as 3.91% of BPL's sub-holding Bipielle Investimenti.

In 2003, through CR Lucca S.p.A. (and another intermediate holding company Reti Bancarie), BPL completely privatized CR Pisa SpA. Pisa Foundation owned 7.48% shares of CR Lucca S.p.A. instead. However, BPL and Pisa Foundation also signed an agreement on 12 December 2003 that BPL would buy the shares from the foundation before 15 January 2008. BPL also bought the shares of Bipielle Investimenti from the foundation.

Absorbed to CR Lucca Pisa Livorno
In 2006 CR Pisa SpA was completely absorbed into CR Lucca SpA, which the latter was renamed into CR Lucca, Pisa & Livorno SpA. Immediately after the merger, on 1 July 2006 Pisa Foundation owned 6.66% shares of the new entity. The last annual report of CR Pisa SpA shown the bank had a shareholders equity of €504.789 million on 31 December 2005.

See also
other saving bank from the provincial capital of Tuscany
 Banca CR Firenze
 Cassa di Risparmio di Carrara
 Cassa di Risparmi di Livorno
 Cassa di Risparmio di Lucca
 Cassa di Risparmio di Prato
 Cassa di Risparmio di Pistoia e della Lucchesia
other bank from the province of Pisa
 Cassa di Risparmio di San Miniato
 Cassa di Risparmio di Volterra
 Banca di Pisa e Fornacette Credito Cooperativo

References

External links

Banks established in 1834
Banks disestablished in 2006
Italian companies disestablished in 2006
Defunct banks of Italy
Companies based in Pisa
Banco Popolare
1834 establishments in the Grand Duchy of Tuscany
Italian companies established in 1834